Shchyolkovo is a city and the administrative center of Shchyolkovsky District in Moscow Oblast, Russia, located on the Klyazma River (Oka's tributary),  northeast of Moscow. Population:   112,865 (2002 Census); 109,255 (1989 Census); 91,000 (1977).

History
It dates back to the 16th century. Town status was granted to it in 1925.

Administrative and municipal status
Within the framework of administrative divisions, Shchyolkovo serves as the administrative center of Shchyolkovsky District. As an administrative division, it is, together with seven rural localities, incorporated within Shchyolkovsky District as the City of Shchyolkovo. As a municipal division, the City of Shchyolkovo is incorporated within Shchyolkovsky Municipal District as Shchyolkovo Urban Settlement.

Transportation
The city is reachable in about one hour by suburban trains from the Yaroslavsky railway station in Moscow.

Twin towns – sister cities

Shchyolkovo is twinned with:

 Brovary, Ukraine
 Brovary Raion, Ukraine
 Celje, Slovenia
 Feodosia, Ukraine
 Gagra, Georgia
 Grodno Region, Belarus
 Grodzisk Wielkopolski County, Poland
 Hemer, Germany

 Orhei District, Moldavia
 Rakoniewice, Poland
 Širvintos, Lithuania
 Talsi, Latvia

References

Notes

Sources

Cities and towns in Moscow Oblast
Moscow Governorate